The church of Santa Maria della Salute in Primavalle is a church in Rome, in the Primavalle district, in the square Alfonso Capecelatro.

History
It was built in the twentieth century by the architect Giorgio Guidi and consecrated 18 March 1960 by Cardinal Luigi Traglia. Pope John Paul II visited the church 15 November 1981.

The church is home parish, erected 30 September 1950 with the decree of the Cardinal Vicar Francesco Marchetti Selvaggiani Inter plures vicos and entrusted to the Franciscan Friars of the Third Order Regular of St. Francis.

List of Cardinal Protectors
 George Bernard Flahiff 30 April 1969 – 22 August 1989
 Antonio Quarracino 28 June 1991 – 28 February 1998
 Jean Honore 21 February 2001 – 28 February 2013
 Kelvin Edward Felix 22 February 2014 – present

References

External links
 Santa Maria della Salute 

Titular churches
Rome Q. XXVII Primavalle
20th-century Roman Catholic church buildings in Italy